Moscow is an unincorporated community in Freeborn County. Minnesota, United States.

History
Moscow was platted in 1857, and named after Moscow, in Russia. A post office was established at Moscow in 1859, and remained in operation until it was discontinued in 1903.

Notes

Unincorporated communities in Freeborn County, Minnesota
Unincorporated communities in Minnesota
1857 establishments in Minnesota Territory
Populated places established in 1857